Wrześnica  is a village in the administrative district of Gmina Czaplinek, within Drawsko County, West Pomeranian Voivodeship, in north-western Poland.

Between 1871 and 1945 the area was part of Germany.

The village has a population of 40.

References

Villages in Sławno County